Actinostephanus haeckeli, also known as the snake sea anemone or Haeckles sea anemone, is a species of sea anemone in the family Actinodendridae.

environment
A. haeckeli mainly inhabits sandy bottoms, lagoons and bays. A. haeckeli can completely retreat into the sandy low-tide areas it mainly also inhabits.

Description
A. haeckeli is 10 to 12 cm in diameter and has 12 long, fat and cylindrical tentacles that are a uniform dark brown. Its body column is short, smooth and has regular stripes covering it, and is quite pale when approaching the base.

The tentacles of A. haeckeli also taper at the tips.

See also
 Sea anemones
 Cnidarians

References

Actinodendridae
Hexacorallia genera